"Need U (100%)" is a song by British musician and DJ Duke Dumont. It features the vocals from British singer A*M*E. It was released as a digital download in the United Kingdom on 31 March 2013, and entered at number one on the UK Singles Chart. The song has also charted in the Netherlands, Belgium and Ireland and reached the number one position on the Billboard Hot Dance Club Songs chart in the United States. The song was written by Duke Dumont, A*M*E, and MNEK, and it was produced by Dumont with additional production by Tommy Forrest. The song was nominated for the 2014 Grammy Award for Best Dance Recording.

The Guardian named "Need U (100%)" the thirteenth best song of 2013, and Pitchfork Media ranked the song number 94 on its year-end list.

Critical reception
Carrie Battan of Pitchfork said that the song, "sounds as though it could fold over onto itself for an eternity." She also states that vocalist A*M*E does well in adding her vocals to the "janky house beat" of the song.

Music video
A music video to accompany the release of "Need U (100%)" was first released onto YouTube on 22 February 2013 at a total length of three minutes and eleven seconds. The video, shot in Los Angeles and starring Rique, features a guy who has his tape recorder stuck inside his body and is frustrated that whenever the song plays everyone around him starts dancing. He decides it's time to remove the device through surgery and after it is removed he looks at the recorder and stops the song from playing, leaving the people around him disappointed. The music video was directed by Ian Robertson.

Track listings

Charts and certifications

Weekly charts

Year-end charts

Certifications

Release history

See also
 List of number-one dance singles of 2013 (U.S.)

References

2013 singles
Duke Dumont songs
Number-one singles in Scotland
UK Singles Chart number-one singles
A*M*E songs
Ministry of Sound singles
Songs written by Duke Dumont
2012 songs
Songs written by MNEK